Pakowki is an unincorporated community in Alberta, Canada within the County of Forty Mile No. 8. It is located along Highway 61 in southeast Alberta. It is one of many ghost towns along the historic Red Coat Trail route. Pakowki name originates from nearby Pakowki Lake, about 10 km south. The word "Pakowki" is Blackfoot for "Bad Water".

Very little remains of Pakowki, foundations and impressions in the ground from buildings can still be seen, although nothing remains, except the former Canadian Pacific Railway section house that has since been moved to a nearby community.

History 

Taken from "The Ghost Towns Journal"

There are many basic causes behind the creation of ghost towns in the Canadian West. Some of these are the failure of a mineral deposit to retain its worth, causing the town that grew up around it to die; falling world markets which in turn speeds the move from town to city; and natural disasters which wipe out, or make untenable, a community. However, the ghost town of Pakowki is one of those unique places which owes its deserted look primarily to miscalculations on the part of its creators.

The Stirling-Weyburn branch of the Canadian Pacific Railway reached the site of Pakowki in 1915, and almost overnight a substantial town sprang into being. Despite the fact that the previous year had been a complete disaster, with scarcely one bushel having been harvested, some of the first buildings to be erected were grain elevators.

The site of present-day Pakowki is reached by traveling 6.5 miles east on Highway 61 from Etzikom. The country is gentle and rolling, beautiful in many respects even when parched and brown.

On the right hand side of one of the rises in the roadway is a large stock yard that stands tall against the skyline. Beyond, as the highway dips, may be seen a small railway section building sporting the sign "Pakowki." The actual town itself lay west of the stockyards, right against the railway tracks. All that remains to mark its location are broken foundations.

Pakowki had a good sized main street fronted along the railway. Everson and Gilchrist had a stove on the east end of town.

Immediately west was a Chinese restaurant, and adjacent to that was the Pioneer House, owned by the Dillenbecks. C. Potter, down the street, had a machine shop ant the agency for Model T cars and trucks, while a lumber yard and two general stores rounded out the picture.

Originally, the grain from a bumper harvest in the fall of 1915 was stored in a large warehouse along the tracks, but the following year, with hopes high, two regular grain elevators were built in the hopes of handling the crops covering nearly 1,400 square miles of homestead land. One of the busiest places in town was Smith's barbershop and pool hall as farmers treated themselves to the luxury of a shave and haircut.

The name Pakowki, when translated roughly from Blackfoot, meant "Bad Water". A large lake situated to the south was noted by Palliser and he included it on his 1865 map as Peekopee. For the business men of 1915, it could have been translated as roughly to mean "bad medicine."

Though there were still many miles of track yet to be laid between Weyburn and Stirling, the C.P.R. was in no rush. Leisurely, it extended its survey, then its grade and finally its tracks eastward to a small settlement known as Manyberries, which it reached in the fall of 1916.

During its slow progress across the semi-desert country, where grades were easy and the right-of-way uncluttered, it had been in the habit of stringing a "Y" out on the prairie to enable its engines to turn around. Manyberries was no exception, and for years to come marked the end of the line. Indeed, as events were to prove, the line past Etzikom was already over-extended. Trains ran twice a week.

Pakowki had one drawback, which was not fully appreciated at the time of its development. Most of the good homestead land lay north and east. Thus, as the rails moved on to a new siding called Orion, the settlers were quick to patronize the new town, which was closer. Since all the transportation was by horse and wagon, the farmers welcomed anything that would shorten their trips to town.

Though the good harvests continued through 1916, the handwriting was already on the wall for Pakowki. The Dillenbecks moved their hotel and restaurant to Orion and were followed by the other business establishments. Within the span of a few months, all that remained of the prairie metropolis was the section house, piles of used lumber, and the basements of houses.

Today, a set of stockyards belonging to the Community Pasture Association of Pincher over looks the ghost town of Pakowki.

In the early 2000s C.P.R. abandoned the less used Stirling-Weyburn branch shortly after pulling the track from Foremost to Consul, Saskatchewan.

See also 
 List of communities in Alberta
 List of ghost towns in Alberta

References 

Localities in the County of Forty Mile No. 8
Ghost towns in Alberta